Seydou Ali Yacouba (born April 6, 1992  in Niamey, Niger) is a Nigerien football player who plays for USM Alger and the Niger national football team.

Career
Born in Niamey, Yacouba began playing as a striker with local side AS Police and the Niger youth national teams. At age 18, he moved to Côte d'Ivoire to join Africa Sports National. At age 20, he moved to Algeria to join USM Alger

USM Alger
On January 12, 2013, it was announced that Yacouba would join USM Alger on a 2.5-year contract.
.

International career
He is a member of the Niger national football team, for which he has played since 2012. He played in the 2012 African Nations Cup, mostly as a right back, was called up to play at the 2012 Africa Cup of Nations. His team was eliminated after the group stage.

International goals
Scores and results list Niger's goal tally first.

Honours
 USM Alger
 Algerian Cup 
 Winner: 2012–13

References

External links 

1992 births
Living people
Nigerien footballers
Niger international footballers
Association football forwards
Nigerien expatriate footballers
Expatriate footballers in Algeria
USM Alger players
2011 African Nations Championship players
Algerian Ligue Professionnelle 1 players
2012 Africa Cup of Nations players
Nigerien expatriate sportspeople in Algeria
People from Niamey